Tang-e Eram (also Romanized as Tang-e-Rām, Tang Eram, and Tang-i-Ram) is a city in Eram District of Dashtestan County, Bushehr province, Iran. At the 2006 census, its population was 2,928 in 637 households. The following census in 2011 counted 3,183 people in 731 households. The latest census in 2016 showed a population of 3,242 people in 875 households.

References 

Cities in Bushehr Province
Populated places in Dashtestan County